The Municipality of Vrhnika is a municipality in Slovenia. The administrative seat of the municipality is the town of Vrhnika.

Settlements
In addition to the municipal seat of Vrhnika, the municipality also includes the following settlements:

 Bevke
 Bistra
 Blatna Brezovica
 Drenov Grič
 Jamnik
 Jerinov Grič
 Lesno Brdo
 Mala Ligojna
 Marinčev Grič
 Mirke
 Mizni Dol
 Padež
 Podlipa
 Pokojišče
 Prezid
 Sinja Gorica
 Smrečje
 Stara Vrhnika
 Strmica
 Trčkov Grič
 Velika Ligojna
 Verd
 Zaplana
 Zavrh pri Borovnici

References

External links

 Municipality of Vrhnika website  
 Municipality of Vrhnika on Geopedia

 
Vrhnika
1994 establishments in Slovenia